Cyperus kabarensis is a species of sedge that is endemic to the Democratic Republic of Congo.

The species was first formally described by the botanist Henri Chermezon in 1937.

See also
 List of Cyperus species

References

kabarensis
Taxa named by Henri Chermezon
Plants described in 1937
Flora of the Democratic Republic of the Congo